Athous  axillaris is a species of click beetle from the family Elateridae. It was described by George Henry Horn in 1871 and is endemic to California.

Description

References

Beetles described in 1871
Endemic fauna of California
Dendrometrinae
Beetles of North America
Fauna without expected TNC conservation status